Wrigley is an English surname originating in the county of Lancashire.
Alan Wrigley (born 1931), Australian writer on topics related to intelligence, defence and security 
Ammon Wrigley (1861–1946), English poet and local historian from Saddleworth
Arthur Wrigley (1912–1965), English cricket scorer and statistician
Arthur Joseph Wrigley (1902–1983), obstetrician and gynaecologist
Bernard Wrigley (born 1948), English singer, actor and comedian
David Wrigley, English general practitioner 
Derek Fuller Wrigley (born 1924), British-born Australian architect
Drew Wrigley (born 1965), American politician
E.A. Wrigley (1931-2022), British historical demographer
Edgar Wrigley (1886−1958), New Zealand rugby union and rugby league player
George Weston Wrigley (1847–1907), Canadian journalist and social reformer
Henry Wrigley (1892–1987), Royal Australian Air Force (RAAF) officer
Hugh Wrigley (1891–1980), Australian Army officer 
Kurt Wrigley (born 1969), Australian rugby league player
Leslie James Wrigley (1875–1933), Australian academic and educationalist
Nicholas Wrigley (born 1955), British merchant banker
Robert Wrigley (born 1951), American poet and educator
Stephen Wrigley (born 1987), Australian football player
Sylvia Spruck Wrigley (born 1968), American/German writer of science fiction, fantasy and aviation non-fiction
Thomas Wrigley, Jr. (born 1988), American economist, educator, and pilot
Tony Wrigley (born 1931), historical demographer
Wilf Wrigley (born 1949), English football player
Zeke Wrigley (1874–1952), baseball player

In the Wm. Wrigley Jr. Company
William Wrigley, Jr. (1861–1932), founder of the Wm. Wrigley Jr. Company
Philip K. Wrigley (1894–1977), son of William Wrigley Jr.
William Wrigley III (1933–99), son of Philip K. Wrigley
William Wrigley, Jr. II (born 1963), son of William Wrigley III, and chairman

In music
The Wrigley Sisters (Jennifer and Hazel), folk music duo

Fictional
Simon 'Bigmac' Wrigley, character in the Johnny Maxwell trilogy by Terry Pratchett

Surnames of English origin